Naft Sefid (also Romanized as Naft Sefīd, Nafte-e Sefĭd, Naft-e Safīd, and Naft-e Sefīd; also known as Naft Seqīd) is a village in Gazin Rural District, Raghiveh District, Haftgel County, Khuzestan Province, Iran. At the 2006 census, its population was 535, in 122 families.

References 

Populated places in Haftkel County